The Mother is an upcoming American action drama film directed by Niki Caro with a screenplay by Misha Green, Andrea Berloff and Peter Craig, from a story by Green. The film stars Jennifer Lopez, Joseph Fiennes, Omari Hardwick, and Gael García Bernal.

The Mother is scheduled to be released on May 12, 2023, by Netflix.

Premise
While fleeing from dangerous assailants, an ex-assassin comes out of hiding to protect the estranged daughter she left earlier in her life.

Cast
 Jennifer Lopez
 Joseph Fiennes
 Omari Hardwick
 Gael García Bernal
 Paul Raci
 Lucy Paez
 Jesse Garcia
 Yvonne Senat Jones

Production
In February 2021, it was announced Jennifer Lopez had joined the cast of the film, with Niki Caro directing, from a screenplay by Misha Green and Andrea Berloff, with Netflix set to distribute.

In September 2021, it was announced Joseph Fiennes, Omari Hardwick, Gael García Bernal, Paul Raci and Lucy Paez had joined the cast of the film. In October 2021, Jesse Garcia and Yvonne Senat Jones joined the cast of the film.

Principal photography began in Vancouver on October 4, 2021. On January 11, 2022, filming was suspended due to the COVID variant outbreak.

In March 2022, filming took place on the Spanish island of Gran Canaria, using the old town of Las Palmas de Gran Canaria as a city in Cuba. The Gabinete Literario, located there, was used as a casino. The south of the island was also chosen to film a party in a villa.

References

External links
 

Upcoming films
2023 films
2023 action drama films
2020s American films
2020s English-language films
American action drama films
English-language Netflix original films
Film productions suspended due to the COVID-19 pandemic
Films about mother–daughter relationships
Films directed by Niki Caro
Films produced by Roy Lee
Films set in Cincinnati
Films set in Cuba
Films shot in the Canary Islands
Films shot in Vancouver
Films with screenplays by Andrea Berloff
Films with screenplays by Peter Craig
Nuyorican Productions films
Upcoming English-language films
Upcoming Netflix original films
Vertigo Entertainment films